Joël Ivo Veltman (born 15 January 1992) is a Dutch professional footballer who plays as a defender for Premier League club Brighton & Hove Albion and the Netherlands national team.

A product of the Ajax youth academy, Veltman made 246 appearances for the Amsterdam club before moving on to Brighton in July 2020 for a £900,000 fee on a three-year deal.

Veltman has won 28 caps for the Netherlands national team since his debut in November 2013.

Club career

Ajax

Veltman began his football career in the youth teams of VV IJmuiden in his hometown of IJmuiden before moving to Ajax in 2001, where he went through the youth ranks of the club. While playing for the Ajax A1 youth squad in 2011–12, Veltman helped his side to win the Nike Eredivisie league title, as well finishing as runners-up to Inter Milan in the NextGen Series (the UEFA Champions League equivalent for under-20 teams) after losing on penalties (5–3) following a 1–1 deadlock after extra time.

He made his official debut for the Ajax first team on 19 August 2012 in an away match against NEC in Nijmegen, entering as a substitute for Mitchell Dijks in the 79th minute; the match ended in a 6–1 away win for Ajax. Following a successful starting season with the Ajax first team, helping his side secure its third-straight national title and his personal first, on 6 June 2013 it was announced that Veltman had extended his contract with Ajax for another four years, keeping him with the club until the summer of 2017.

On 5 August 2013, Veltman played in the Eerste Divisie debut of the newly-promoted reserves team Jong Ajax at the start of the season. Substituted off in the 89th minute of a 2–0 home win, due to a sustained injury, Veltman found himself sidelined for the next two months. He returned from injury on 30 September 2013 in another match for Jong Ajax, this time against Volendam, where he scored his first professional goal in the 3–2 loss at the Sportpark De Toekomst, netting the opener in the seventh minute. On 22 October 2013, Veltman made his continental debut for the first team when he replaced injured first-choice centre-back Niklas Moisander in the 2013–14 UEFA Champions League group stage match against Celtic. The away match at Celtic Park ended in a 2–1 loss for the Amsterdam side.

In April 2018, Veltman tore his ACL in a match against VVV-Venlo. After a long recovery he returned to first-team action in February 2019.

Brighton & Hove Albion

2020–21 season: Debut campaign 

On 29 July 2020, Premier League club Brighton & Hove Albion announced that they had completed the signing of Veltman from Ajax on a three-year deal after activating the release clause in his contract, valued at £900,000. Veltman chose to wear the number 34 jersey, as a tribute to former Ajax teammate Abdelhak Nouri, who collapsed during a friendly in 2017 and went into an induced coma. Veltman made his debut for the Sussex side on 17 September 2020 starting in a 4–0 home victory over Portsmouth in the EFL Cup. Veltman made his league debut for Brighton on 3 October, coming on as a substitute at half time for Tariq Lamptey in a eventual 4–2 away defeat at Everton. He scored his first goal for the Sussex side, scoring an equaliser in an eventual 2–1 home defeat against bitter rivals Crystal Palace on 22 February 2021.

2021–22 season

In the first Crystal Palace rivalry match of the 2021–22 season away at Crystal Palace on 27 September, from a poor Vicente Guaita goal kick, Veltman hit a long ball up to Neal Maupay in which he lobbed the keeper and scored a 90+5th equaliser ending the match at 1–1, taking a point back to the south coast. On 7 May 2022, Veltman played the whole match of the 4–0 humiliation of Manchester United, helping Brighton to their biggest ever top flight victory. On 22 May, the last game of the season, Veltman scored his second goal for the Albion, the equaliser in an eventual 3–1 home victory over West Ham. The win secured Brighton's highest ever top flight finish, finishing in ninth place. Veltman revealed that he felt the 2021–22 season was his best of his career, earning the nickname Mr Consistent  while also finishing as the runner-up in Albions Supporters' Player of the Season award. He spoke of his form saying “It probably is my best season in terms of how I have played. The Premier League is the toughest competition in the world. I can say myself that I did well, I can be proud."

2022–23 season

After coming on replacing the injured Tariq Lamptey, with Alexis Mac Allister flicking on from a Pascal Groß corner Veltman chested home into the bottom corner to make it 2–0 in the eventual 4–0 home win over West Ham.

International career
Youth
Veltman made Netherlands debut playing for the under-17 squad on 10 February 2009 in the 2009 edition of the La Manga Cup in the 0–4 loss against Czech Republic U17s. He also played in the 2009 UEFA European Under-17 Championship group stage match against England U17s which ended in a 1–1 draw, having previously appeared in three of the qualification matches. On 2 September 2010, Veltman made his debut for Netherlands U19s in a friendly against Germany which ended in a 2–2 draw. On 9 February 2011, Veltman scored his first international goal in another friendly for the U19s against France, with the match ending in a 1–1 draw. On 23 May 2012, Veltman made his debut for the U21 side at the 2012 Toulon Tournament in France. He appeared in four matches for the Dutch, making his debut against Egypt in the 3–0 win.

Senior
On 8 November 2013, it was announced that Veltman received his first call-up for the Netherlands senior team by head coach Louis van Gaal for the friendly matches against Japan and Colombia. Remaining on the bench for the duration of the first match against Japan, Veltman made his debut for the first team on 19 November in the fixture against Colombia, playing the full 90 minutes in the 0–0 draw at the Amsterdam Arena. On 31 May 2014, Veltman was named as part of the 23-man squad heading to the finals of the 2014 FIFA World Cup under Van Gaal. He was joined by Ajax teammates Daley Blind and Jasper Cillessen.

Veltman was named in the Dutch 34-man preliminary squad for Euro 2020 on 14 May 2021, with the 26-man squad to be announced on 26 May. The tournament which is taken place in the summer of 2021 due to the previous year's postponement as a result of Coronavirus. He was included in the final 26-man squad on 26 May. His only appearance of the tournament came in the Netherlands' opening group game against Ukraine at the Johan Cruyff Arena in Amsterdam on 13 June, where he came on in the 88th minute replacing Jurriën Timber in a 3-2 victory. The Dutch were knocked out in the Round of 16 after a 2–0 loss against Czech Republic on 27 June at the Puskás Aréna in Budapest.

Personal life
Veltman is of distant Malaysian & Indonesian descent through one of his great-grandmothers.

Career statistics
Club

International

Scores and results list Netherlands' goal tally first.

HonoursAjax Eredivisie: 2012–13, 2013–14, 2018–19
 KNVB Cup: 2018–19
 Johan Cruyff Shield: 2013, 2019
 UEFA Europa League runner-up: 2016–17Netherlands FIFA World Cup third place: 2014Individual'''

 Eredivisie Team of the Year: 2013–14, 2014–15, 2015–16

References

External links

 Joël Veltman at Voetbal International'' 
 Netherlands stats at OnsOranje

1992 births
Living people
People from Velsen
Dutch footballers
Netherlands youth international footballers
Netherlands international footballers
Association football defenders
AFC Ajax players
Jong Ajax players
Brighton & Hove Albion F.C. players
Eredivisie players
Eerste Divisie players
Premier League players
2014 FIFA World Cup players
UEFA Euro 2020 players
Dutch expatriate footballers
Expatriate footballers in England
Dutch expatriate sportspeople in England
Dutch people of Indonesian descent
Footballers from North Holland